Harry Aaron Brittain (born 8 October 1955) is an Australian-born Canadian former professional tennis player.

Brittain was born into a Jewish family in Sydney and attended Punchbowl High School. He won the junior singles at the 1974 Australian Open. His best singles world ranking was 330 and he featured in qualifying for the 1975 Wimbledon Championships. Immigrating to Canada, Brittain earned a place in their national top 10 rankings by the late 1970s.

References

External links
 
 

1955 births
Living people
Australian male tennis players
Canadian male tennis players
Australian Open (tennis) junior champions
Grand Slam (tennis) champions in boys' singles
Jewish tennis players
Tennis players from Sydney